The 1976 Hawaii Rainbow Warriors football team represented the University of Hawaiʻi at Mānoa as an independent during the 1976 NCAA Division I football season. In their first season under head coach Larry Price, the Rainbow Warriors compiled a 3–8 record.

Schedule

References

Hawaii
Hawaii Rainbow Warriors football seasons
Hawaii Rainbow Warriors football